The Carnival of Binche is an annual event in the Belgian town of Binche during the Sunday, Monday, and Tuesday preceding Ash Wednesday. The carnival is the best known of several that take place in Wallonia, Belgium, at the same time. Its history dates back to approximately the 14th century, and since 2003, it is recognised as a Masterpiece of the Oral and Intangible Heritage of Humanity by UNESCO.

History
The first written records of the Carnival of Binche date back to 1394, the festivities then corresponding to the beginning of Lent (the 40 days between Ash Wednesday and Easter). Wearing a mask was forbidden under the Napoleonic regime, so the Gilles, some of the carnival's most important participants today, appeared for the first time in texts in 1795 as masked characters revolting.

In 2003, the Carnival of Binche was recognised as one of the Masterpieces of the Oral and Intangible Heritage of Humanity by UNESCO.

Celebrations
Events related to the carnival begin up to seven weeks prior to the primary celebrations. Street performances and public displays traditionally occur on the Sundays approaching Ash Wednesday, consisting of prescribed musical acts, dancing, and marching. Large numbers of Binche's inhabitants spend the Sunday directly prior to Ash Wednesday in costume.

Gilles

The centrepiece of the carnival's proceedings are clown-like performers known as Gilles. Appearing, for the most part, on Shrove Tuesday (or Mardi Gras), the Gilles are characterised by their vibrant dress, wax masks and wooden footwear. They number up to 1,000 at any given time, range in age from 3 to 60 years old, and are customarily male. The honour of being a Gille at the carnival is something that is aspired to by local men.

From dawn on the morning of the carnival's final day, Gilles appear in the centre of Binche, to dance to the sound of drums and ward off evil spirits with sticks. Later during the day, they don large hats adorned with ostrich feathers, which can cost more than $300 US dollars to rent, and march through the town with baskets of oranges. These oranges are thrown to, and sometimes at, members of the crowd gathered to view the procession. The vigour and longevity of the orange-throwing event has in past caused damage to property – some residents choose to seal windows to prevent this. The oranges are considered good luck because they are a gift from the Gilles and it is an insult to throw them back.

References

Notes

Bibliography

External links

 BrusselsLife: Binche Carnival
 Official site of the Carnival of Binche  

Masterpieces of the Oral and Intangible Heritage of Humanity
Belgian folklore
Binche
Festivals in Belgium
Walloon culture
Tourist attractions in Hainaut (province)
Binche
Spring (season) events in Belgium